Willow Cove is a codename for a CPU microarchitecture developed by Intel and released in September 2020. Willow Cove is the successor to the Sunny Cove microarchitecture, and is fabricated using Intel's enhanced 10 nm process node called 10 nm SuperFin (10SF). The microarchitecture powers 11th-generation Intel Core mobile processors (codenamed "Tiger Lake").

The Willow Cove microarchitecture was succeeded by Golden Cove.

Features 
Intel first described Tiger Lake and Willow Cove during their Architecture Day in 2020. Willow Cove is almost identical to the previous microarchitecture but introduces new security features, a redesigned cache subsystem, and higher clock speeds. Intel claims that these changes, in addition to the new 10SF process node, give an additional 10–20% performance increase from Sunny Cove.

Improvements 
 Larger L2 caches (1.25 MB per core from 512 KB per core)
 Larger L3 caches (3 MB per core from 2 MB per core)
 A new AVX-512 instruction: Vector Pair Intersection to a Pair of Mask Registers, VP2INTERSECT
 Control Flow Enforcement Technology to prevent return-oriented programming and jump-oriented programming exploitation techniques
 Full memory (RAM) encryption
 Indirect branch tracking and shadow stack
 Intel Key Locker
 AVX/AVX2 instructions support for Pentium Gold and Celeron processors has been unlocked

Products 

Willow Cove powers Intel's 11th-generation Intel Core mobile processors (codenamed Tiger Lake). Tiger Lake-U processors were released on September 2, 2020, while Tiger Lake-H35 were released on January 11, 2021. Tiger Lake-H processors were launched on May 11, 2021.

References 

X86 microarchitectures
Intel
Intel microarchitectures